Carr ministry may refer to the Government of New South Wales led by Bob Carr:
Carr ministry (1995–1997)
Carr ministry (1997–1999)
Carr ministry (1999–2003)
Carr ministry (2003–2005)